Frederick Arthur Sanders (1856-1930) was a Church of England priest, most notably Archdeacon of Exeter from 1909 until 1924.

Sanders was born in Exeter; educated at Marlborough and Keble College, Oxford; and ordained in 1879. After a curacies in Lichfield and Buckland Monachorum he held incumbencies at Brixton  and Woodleigh.

He died on 14 August 1930.

References

1856 births
1930 deaths
19th-century English Anglican priests
20th-century English Anglican priests
Alumni of Keble College, Oxford
People educated at Marlborough College
Archdeacons of Exeter